

Players

Seeds

Qualifiers

Lucky losers
  Łukasz Kubot

Qualifying draw

First qualifier

Second qualifier

Third qualifier

Fourth qualifier

References
 Qualifying Draw

Men's qualifying
Medibank International Sydney - Men's qualifying